Pălatca is a commune in Cluj County, Transylvania, Romania. It is composed of five villages: Băgaciu (Kisbogács), Mureșenii de Câmpie (formerly Imbuz; Omboztelke), Pălatca, Petea (Magyarpete) and Sava (Mezőszava).

Demographics 
According to the census from 2002 there was a total population of 1,374 people living in this commune. Of this population, 71.90% are ethnic Romanians, 23.87% are ethnic Hungarians and 4.14% ethnic Romani.

References 

 Atlasul localităților județului Cluj (Cluj County Localities Atlas), Suncart Publishing House, Cluj-Napoca, 

Communes in Cluj County
Localities in Transylvania